Júlio Dinis, pseudonym of Joaquim Guilherme Gomes Coelho (14 November 1839 – 12 September 1871) was a Portuguese doctor and poet, playwright and novelist. He was the first great novelist of modern Portuguese middle-class society. His novels, extremely popular in his lifetime and still widely read in Portugal today, are written in a simple and direct style accessible to a large public.

His first attacks of tuberculosis forced him to resign as deputy professor at the medical school of Porto. He had already published several tales of country life in the Jornal do Porto. Retiring to the coastal town of Ovar for his health, he wrote the novel for which he is best known, As Pupilas do Senhor Reitor (1867; "The Dean's Pupils"), depicting country life and scenery in a simple and appealing style. It was based on his own family situation and described the influence of the English on Portuguese culture. (His mother was English.) Encouraged by its immediate success, he published Uma Família Inglesa (1868; "An English Family"), a novel describing English society in Porto.

Júlio Dinis died at the young age of 31 of tuberculosis, and some of his works including his poems and plays were published posthumously. He is best-remembered for his novels: As Pupilas do Senhor Reitor had gone through 14 editions by 1900. A translation of Uma Família Inglesa by Margaret Jull Costa was published in 2020, the first of his works to be available in English.

Works

 As Pupilas do Senhor Reitor (1867)
 A Morgadinha dos Canaviais (1868)
 Uma Família Inglesa (1868) trans. Margaret Jull Costa, An English Family, Dedalus Books, 2020, 
 Serões da Província (1870)
 Os Fidalgos da Casa Mourisca (1871)
 Poesias (1873)
 Inéditos e Dispersos (1910)
 Teatro Inédito (1946–1947)

References

External links 
 
 
 

Portuguese medical writers
University of Porto alumni
People from Porto
1839 births
1871 deaths
Portuguese male novelists
19th-century Portuguese writers
19th-century deaths from tuberculosis
19th-century Portuguese novelists
19th-century male writers
Tuberculosis deaths in Portugal

Portuguese people of British descent